The  is the former home and workshop of Peter Paul Rubens (1577–1640) in Antwerp. Purchased in 1610, Rubens had the Flemish townhouse renovated and extended on the basis of designs by Rubens himself.  After the renovations, the house and its courtyard garden had the outlook of an Italian palazzo, which reflected the artistic ideals of Rubens. The ensemble is now a museum dedicated mainly to the work of Rubens and his contemporaries.

Rubens's house during his lifetime

A year after marrying Isabella Brant in 1609, Rubens began construction of an Italian-style villa on the then-Vaartstraat (now the Wapper, 9–11), at the time located at the banks of the Herentalse Vaart canal. Rubens designed the building himself, based on studies of Italian Renaissance palace architecture that also formed the basis of his Palazzi di Genova. The layout included his home, studio, a monumental portico and an interior courtyard. The courtyard opens into a Baroque garden that he also planned.
  
In the adjacent studio, he and his students executed many of the works for which Rubens is famous. He had established a well-organised workshop that met the demands of his active studio, including large commissions from England, France, Spain and Bavaria and other locations. He relied on students and collaborators for much of the actual work. Rubens himself, however, guaranteed the quality and often finished paintings with his own hand. In a separate private studio he made drawings, portraits and small paintings without the assistance of his students and collaborators.

Rubens's house after his lifetime
Rubens spent most of his lifetime in this building. After his death, his wife Helena Fourment let the building to William Cavendish and his wife. After the latter left in 1660, the house was sold.
On the World's Fair Brussels International 1910 there was a real-size reconstruction of the house of P.P. Rubens, built by the architect Henri Blomme. The reconstruction was a romantic interpretation of what the building used to be, full of ornaments, but it promoted the idea to save the building. After his death in 1921, the architect Henri Blomme left an important legacy to the city of Antwerp to buy the house. This happened finally in 1937.

The city bought the house in 1937 and after an extensive restoration the Rubenshuis was opened to the public in 1946. Dozens of paintings and artworks by Rubens and his contemporaries were installed in the rooms, as well as period furniture. Paintings include his early Adam and Eve (c. 1600) and a self portrait made when he was about fifty.

The Rubenianum, a centre and archive dedicated to the study of Rubens, is in a building at the rear of the garden.

Collection

By Rubens

By others

See also
 Rockox House
 List of single-artist museums

Notes

External links

360°-panorama van de Rubenshuis

Museums in Antwerp
Biographical museums in Belgium
Houses in Belgium
Historic house museums in Belgium
Art museums and galleries in Belgium
Museums established in 1946
1946 establishments in Belgium
Peter Paul Rubens
Works by Peter Paul Rubens
Museums devoted to one artist